Ihor Yavorskyi (born 9 June 1959) is a Ukrainian former footballer and football manager.

Career 
Yavorskyi began his career with FC Falcon Lviv in the Ukrainian amateur leagues. In 1978, he signed with FC Nyva Pidhaitsi of the Soviet Second League. During his career in the Soviet Union he played with FC Kosmos Pavlohrad, FC Metalist Kharkiv, FC Guria Lanchkhuti. In 1991, he played abroad in the Slovak National Football League with ŠK Futura Humenné, and returned home to play with NK Veres Rivne in the Ukrainian Premier League. He finished his career with Boliden in Sweden, and with Nyva Ternopil in 1997.

Managerial career 
He was appointed the head coach of PFC Nyva Ternopil in 1994. He managed several teams in the Premier League as FC Metalurh Donetsk, FC Prykarpattya Ivano-Frankivsk, and served as an assistant coach with FC Lviv, FC Karpaty Lviv, and Metalurh Donetsk. In 2015, he was appointed the inaugural head coach for Toronto Atomic FC in the Canadian Soccer League. Midway through the season he parted ways with Toronto.

In 2016, he managed Nyva Terebovlya in the Ukrainian Amateur Football Championship. In 2017, he announced his resignation from Nyva.

Honors

Individual
Football Championship of the Ukrainian SSR Top scorer: 1989

References 

 

1959 births
Living people
Ukrainian footballers
Ukrainian football managers
FC Nyva Ternopil players
FC Metalist Kharkiv players
FC Guria Lanchkhuti players
NK Veres Rivne players
Ukrainian Premier League players
FC Nyva Ternopil managers
FC Metalurh Donetsk managers
FC Prykarpattia Ivano-Frankivsk (2004) managers
Ukrainian Premier League managers
Canadian Soccer League (1998–present) managers
FC Nyva Vinnytsia managers
Association football forwards
Sportspeople from Lviv Oblast